J. McCormack Farm was a historic farm located near Wilmington, New Castle County, Delaware. The property included four contributing buildings. They were a stone house (c. 1830), a stone and frame bank barn (c. 1830), storage building, and corn crib. The house was a two-story, gable-roofed, stuccoed stone structure with a two-story rear wing. The barn walls were of semi-coursed fieldstone finished with a pebbled stucco.

It was added to the National Register of Historic Places in 1986 and demolished between 1992 and 2002. J. McCormack Farm has since been demolished.

References

Farms on the National Register of Historic Places in Delaware
Houses completed in 1830
Houses in New Castle County, Delaware
1830 establishments in Delaware
National Register of Historic Places in Wilmington, Delaware